Colin Ward  (1924–2010) was a British anarchist writer

Colin Ward is also the name of:

 Colin Ward (baseball) (born 1960), Major League Baseball pitcher
Colin Ward (ice hockey) (born 1970), hockey player 
Colin Ward (rugby league) (born 1971), Australian Rugby league player